James Kipkosgei Murgor is a Kenyan politician and a Member of Parliament for Keiyo North Constituency since 2013.

Murgor is a trained medical doctor with an undergraduate degree in Medicine & Surgery and a Masters in Internal Medicine, both from the University of Nairobi. Before joining politics he was a practicing medical consultant running Cherang’any Nursing Home.

He previously worked at Kitui, Machakos and Kenyatta National Hospital as a Medical Officer and  a Registrar respectively.

He is the brother-in-law of the late Rongai MP Willy Komen.

References

Jubilee Party politicians
Members of the National Assembly (Kenya)
21st-century Kenyan physicians
People from Elgeyo-Marakwet County
Year of birth missing (living people)
Living people
University of Nairobi alumni